The Liverpool Sessions is the acclaimed debut EP release of singer-songwriter Tracy Bonham, released in 1995. The Boston Phoenix noted its "stylistic stretches—a torch ballad, psychedelia, a kid's song, hardcore", featuring "the rough-hewn pop gem 'Dandelion', the thrashy, new-wavish '18 Heads Roll By', and the punkish rant 'I'm Not a Waif'." In a Hits Magazine interview, Bonham herself called it "a good record [... but] a rush job and a little immature."

Track listing
"Sunshine" (Bonham)
"Dandelion" (Bonham)
"18 Heads Roll By" (Bonham)
"The Real" (Bonham) (later appeared on The Burdens of Being Upright)
"Talk" (Bonham, Hager, Nolan, Parsons)
"I'm Not a Waif" (Bonham)
"Big Foot" (Leach)

Personnel
Tracy Bonham – guitar, violin, vocals
Brian Nolan – drums
Drew Parsons – organ, bass guitar

Production
Producer: Josh Hager
Engineer: Paul David Hager
Assistant engineer: Alex U. Case
Mixing: Paul David Hager
Mixing assistant: Alex U. Case
Mastering: Greg Calbi
Design: Satori Igarasdhi

References

External links

Tracy Bonham albums
1995 debut EPs